Sascha Urweider (born 18 September 1980 in Meiringen) is a Swiss former cyclist. He rode in the 2005 Giro d'Italia.

Palmares
2003
1st Stage 4 Giro della Valle d'Aosta
9th Gara Milionaria
2004
3rd Giro del Lago Maggiore
3rd Berner Rundfahrt
8th Tour du lac Léman

References

1980 births
Living people
Swiss male cyclists
People from Interlaken-Oberhasli District
Sportspeople from the canton of Bern